Harris Chueu is a former South African footballer and football manager, who currently works as goalkeeper coach by Mamelodi Sundowns.

Career
During his career he played with Derry City FC of the League of Ireland.

Coaching career
In the past, he also managed the Orlando Pirates and Mamelodi Sundowns.

References 

Living people
1961 births
Derry City F.C. players
League of Ireland players
South African soccer managers
Place of birth missing (living people)

Association footballers not categorized by position
South African soccer players